Daniela Schippers (born 28 March 1995) is a Guatemalan former tennis player.

On the ITF Junior Circuit, Schippers has a career-high combined ranking of 213, achieved on 23 January 2012.

In her career, Schippers won two doubles titles on the ITF Women's Circuit. On 11 November 2013, she reached her best singles ranking of world No. 1103. On 18 November 2013, she peaked at No. 531 in the doubles rankings.

Since her debut for the Guatemala Fed Cup team in 2010, Schippers has a 18–12 record in international competition.

She was studying at Florida State University, between 2013-2017.

Her older sister Paulina is also a tennis player.

ITF Circuit finals

Doubles: 5 (2 titles, 3 runner-ups)

National representation

Fed Cup
Schippers made her Fed Cup debut for Guatemala in 2010, while the team was competing in the Americas Zone Group II, when she was 15 years and 22 days old.

Fed Cup (18–12)

Singles (9–9)

Doubles (9–3)

References

External links

 
 
 

1995 births
Living people
Sportspeople from Guatemala City
Guatemalan female tennis players
Florida State Seminoles women's tennis players
Central American and Caribbean Games bronze medalists for Guatemala
Competitors at the 2014 Central American and Caribbean Games
Competitors at the 2018 Central American and Caribbean Games
Central American and Caribbean Games medalists in tennis